Seth Kaper-Dale is an American Protestant pastor and activist. He has been co-pastor at the Reformed Church of Highland Park (RCHP) in New Jersey since 2001. Before coming to RCHP, he spent time in both Ecuador and India. He was the Green Party candidate in the New Jersey gubernatorial election, 2017. He won 9,849, or 0.47%, of votes cast.

Background and education 

Seth Kaper-Dale was born in Montpelier, Vermont and attended Montpelier High School. He attended Hope College and then the Princeton Theological Seminary.

Kaper-Dale is married to Stephanie Kaper-Dale, co-pastor of the Reformed Church of Highland Park, with whom he has three children.

Advocacy and activism
In 2006, Kaper-Dale co-founded the RCHP-Affordable Housing Corporation, which has created housing for women aging out of foster care, veterans, the homeless, the mentally ill, re-entering citizens, justice-involved youth, and refugees.  He is also the co-founder of Who Is My Neighbor? Inc., a community development agency in Highland Park, New Jersey.

In 2012, he received national attention when his church became a sanctuary for Indonesian immigrants facing deportation.

In 2017, he intervened in a possible preemptive strike by ICE, in the presence of Governor Murphy.

Positions
Kapper-Dale supports legalization of marijuana and use of tax income to support treatment programs. He is a proponent of single-payer health care insurance.

Electoral history

Bibliography 
A Voice for Justice (2013)

References

External links

Year of birth missing (living people)
Living people
Activists from New Jersey
American political activists
Candidates in the 2017 United States elections
Hope College alumni
New Jersey Greens
People from Highland Park, New Jersey
People from Montpelier, Vermont
Princeton Theological Seminary alumni